Pavel Lyutsko (born 1 July 1987) is a Belarusian former professional footballer.

External links

1987 births
Living people
Belarusian footballers
Association football defenders
FC RUOR Minsk players
FC Dinamo Minsk players
FC Torpedo-BelAZ Zhodino players
FC Vitebsk players
FC SKVICH Minsk players
FC Granit Mikashevichi players
FC Gomel players
FC Smorgon players
FC Belshina Bobruisk players